Wilson v. Mason, 5 U.S. (1 Cranch) 45 (1801), was a United States Supreme Court case.

Background
In 1779 the General Assembly of the Commonwealth of Virginia enacted a statute that authorized the sale of otherwise unowned land to private buyers. The purchaser would receive a receipt for the amount of land to which he was entitled. He would then take the receipt to the Land Office and enter a description of the specific land he wanted to claim. Finally the county surveyor would survey the land according to the description entered into the records of the Land Office and record the survey in the county records.

In April 1780 Mason claimed  in two plats along a tributary of the Green River. In October of the same year he restated and clarified his claim with the surveyor. The survey of Mason's land was conducted in the fall of 1783. Changes were made to the claim during the survey. Wilson filed suit to prevent the title to the land they both claimed transferring to Mason. He claimed that Mason's claim was too vague and that the survey was not conducted properly.

The decision
The essential issue before the court was one of when the claim was properly made.  By the time the Supreme Court heard the case, the land was no longer in Virginia, but was now part of Kentucky.  Also, the statutes at issue were passed by the Virginia Legislature prior to the ratification of the United States Constitution.  Nevertheless, the court felt bound to interpret the law as it was in 1780. The time-line was thus as follows:
 Mason makes claim to land
 Wilson makes claim to land
 Mason surveys land and in so doing may have changed the original claim
The court ruled that it was the claim and not the survey that was dispositive.  Thus, Mason's claim should have been the valid one.  However, the Court concluded that the Mason's survey was performed contrary to the claim.  Therefore, for Mason's title to be valid, the survey and not the claim must be dispositive.

The Court ruled for Wilson and gave him title over the land in question.

See also
 List of United States Supreme Court cases, volume 5
 Property law

Notes and references

External links
 

United States Supreme Court cases
1801 in United States case law
George Mason
United States Supreme Court cases of the Marshall Court